These are the official results of the Men's 100 metres Backstroke event at the 1993 FINA Short Course World Championships held in Palma de Mallorca, Spain.

Finals

Qualifying heats

See also
1992 Men's Olympic Games 100m Backstroke
1993 Men's European LC Championships 100m Backstroke

References
 Results
 swimrankings

B